Pittyn (or Piti) is a town in the Boudry Department of Ganzourgou Province in central Burkina Faso. The town had a population of 1,660.

References

External links
Satellite map at Maplandia

Populated places in the Plateau-Central Region
Ganzourgou Province